Mary K. Hawes was a computer scientist who identified the need for a common business language in accounting, which led to the development of COBOL. COBOL is short for Common Business Oriented Language. It was written to resemble ordinary English. For this new language, they wish it can be run on different brands of computers and perform some advanced accounting calculation such as payroll calculation. She proposed this new language in March 1959, when she was working as a senior product planning analyst for the Electro Data Division of Burroughs Corporation. She approached Grace Hopper with the proposal, who suggested that they ask the U.S. Department of Defense (DOD) for funding. Charles Philips, an employee at the DOD, agreed and in May 1959 approximately 40 representatives of computer users and computer manufacturers met and formed the Short Range Committee of the Conference on Data Systems Languages (CODASYL).

Hawes chaired the data descriptions subcommittee in the Short-Range Committee, the team that was initially tasked with identifying problems with the current business compilers. 

Hawes co-authored the books Optimized code generation from extended-entry decision tables published in September 1971, Feature analysis of generalized database management systems: CODASYL Systems Committee published in May 1971, and A survey of generalized database management systems published in May 1969.

References 

Year of birth missing
Possibly living people
American women computer scientists
American computer scientists
COBOL